Sabrisho or Sabrishoʿ may refer to:

Sabrisho I, patriarch of the Church of the East (596–604)
Sabrisho II, patriarch of the Church of the East (831–835)
Sabrisho III, patriarch of the Church of the East (1064–1072)
Sabrisho IV, patriarch of the Church of the East (1222–1224)
Sabrisho V, patriarch of the Church of the East (1226–1256)